Turn Out the Lights is the second studio album by American singer-songwriter Julien Baker. It was released on October 27, 2017, by Matador Records.

Background 
Julien Baker began writing Turn Out the Lights while on tour for her debut album Sprained Ankle. The overall recording period for the album was said to be six days, each lasting twelve hours. As with Sprained Ankle, Baker self-produced Turn Out the Lights. Following the success of her debut, Baker gained positive attention and would begin working with Matador Records who helped release Turn Out the Lights. The album was recorded in the Memphis-based recording studio Ardent Studios. 

The album features violinist Camille Faulkner, who Baker met as a student at Middle Tennessee State University. Others who collaborated on the album consist of several confidants from Baker's youth. The release of the album coincided with a concert in Manhattan at Town Hall.

Themes 
Turn Out the Lights covers a broad range of themes from Julien Baker's personal experiences with faith to her sexuality and identity. Similarly to Sprained Ankle, Baker once again touches on mental health and substance abuse. Despite the tone of her music, the album also contains a message of hope.

Critical reception 

Turn Out the Lights holds a score of 83 out of 100 on the review aggregator website Metacritic based on 24 reviews, indicating "universal acclaim" from critics. In a review for The A.V. Club, Kyle Ryan wrote that "As Baker digs into mental health, relationships, faith, and adulthood, Turn Out The Lights is, understandably, absolutely crushing... it is beautifully crafted throughout, full of the kinds of songs that linger long after they've ended." Kika Chatterjee of Alternative Press rated the album 4.5/5 stars, stating that the album "proves [Baker]'s had enough pain to last several lifetimes. There's an elegance to her music that wasn't there before—a sudden bright piano riff over deep guitar; a harrowing, shouted acapella—that feels like a coming of age."

Year-end lists

Track listing

Personnel
Julien Baker – vocals (2–11), guitars (2–5, 8, 10), piano (1, 2, 4, 6, 7, 9, 11), organ (6, 7)
Camille Faulkner – strings (1, 2, 7, 9, 11)
Cameron Boucher – clarinet and saxophone (1, 2)
Matthew Gilliam – additional vocals (9)
Calvin Lauber – recording engineer, pre-mix
Craig Silvey - final mix engineer

Charts

References 

2017 albums
Julien Baker albums
Matador Records albums